Biederthal is a commune in the Haut-Rhin department in Alsace in north-eastern France. It is located on the border with Switzerland, next to the Swiss villages of Rodersdorf and Metzerlen-Mariastein.

See also
Communes of the Haut-Rhin department

References

Communes of Haut-Rhin